Kwʼadza (Qwadza), or Ngomvia, is an extinct Afroasiatic language formerly spoken in Tanzania in the Mbulu District.  The last speaker died sometime between 1976 and 1999.

Classification
Kwʼadza is poorly attested, and apart from perhaps being close to Aasax, its classification is not certain. Although it has a large number of identifiably Cushitic roots, the non-Cushitic numerals itame 'one' and beʼa ~ mbɛa 'two' suggest a connection with Hadza, while haka 'four' suggests a connection with Sandawe. It is possible that Kwʼadza borrowed e.g. 'four' from Sandawe, but also that it was a non-Cushitic language whose speakers were undergoing language shift to Cushitic when it was recorded.

Phonology 
The phonology is not certain, but the following has been suggested (Ehret 1980):

Consonants 

 and  have the allophones  and  before front vowels.  is 'mildly' ejective.

Vowels

Notes

References 
 Christopher Ehret, 1980. "Kwʼadza vocabulary". ms. 

South Cushitic languages
Languages of Tanzania
Extinct languages of Africa
Unclassified languages of Africa
Languages extinct in the 20th century